Mateer Memorial Church is a protestant church located in Trivandrum, India. It is under the Church of South India. 

It was built in December, 1906, in the heart of the city.

History 
Before the construction of the M.M. Church L.M.S people of Trivandrum worshipped in a church constructed by the Protestant evangelical trust in the 1830s. Rev. Samuel Sumanam, father of Mr. S.I. Sumanam from Paraniyam, was working in that church as an evangelist from 1878 onwards. The Trivandrum L.M.S. Church became a pastorate in 1895, and Mathew Kesari, father of Rev. John M. Kesari and grandfather of Rev. J. Eben Kesari was the first Indian to be ordained as the pastor of that church. Rev. Mathew Kesari retired from service in 1904 when the new church was still under construction. His son John M. Kesari was the first pastor of the newly constructed Mateer Memorial Church, his period of service being from April 1905 to March, 1913.

On 29 April 2022 the South Kerala diocese of the Church of South India (CSI) took over control of the church and converted it into a cathedral by Bishop Dharmaraj Rasalam. This move seems to have been opposed by the parishioners.

Architecture 
The architectural style used in constructing the church was hallenkirche (hall church) style. The church building was made in granite, with a square bell tower with a vestibule beneath and a roof supported by gothic arches. The Celtic cross on the bell tower is made of cut stone, and commemorates Mateer's Irish background.

Rev. Samuel Mateer 
Rev. Samuel Mateer, after whom the church was named, was the first missionary who endeavored to grow an indigenous church. He prepared local people for church ministry and tried to transfer administrative responsibilities to them. It was during his tenure that a number of local people were ordained as ministers.

Rev. Mateer is designated as the pioneer of indigenization of the church. When he arrived there were 25 congregations, 3000 Christians and an annual income of Rs. 800/-. However, when he took leave after 33 years, the number of congregations had increased to 56, Christians to 10,060 and annual income to Rs. 3000/-.

In 1890, Mrs. Mateer had to return to England owing to ill health. Rev. Samuel Mateer went to England in 1891 on leave, and died there on 24 December 1893. It was in the same year that the Trivandrum Church was elevated to the position of a pastorate. The church building constructed in the LMS compound and dedicated to the loving memory of Mateer was opened for worship on 1 December 1906, along with the centenary celebrations of the London Missionary Society.

References

External links
NATIVE LIFE IN TRAVANCORE by The REV. SAMUEL MATEER, F.L.S.

Churches in Thiruvananthapuram
Religious organizations established in 1838
Churches completed in 1906
1838 establishments in India
Church of South India church buildings in India